Bertilia is a genus of true bugs belonging to the family Cimicidae.

Species:
 Bertilia valdiviana (Philippi, 1865)

References

Cimicidae
Cimicomorpha genera